Guibourg may refer to

 Georges Guibourg (June 3, 1891 - January 8, 1970 ), a French singer, author, writer, playwright, and actor
 Étienne Guibourg (1610 – 1680), a French Roman Catholic abbé who performed Black Masses for Catherine Monvoisin in the Affair of the Poisons
 Edmundo Guibourg, winner of the Honour Konex Award in 1987